Frederick of Saxony may refer to:

Frederick I, Elector of Saxony, or Frederick the Belligerent (1370–1428), ruler of Saxony from 1422 to 1428
Frederick II, Elector of Saxony, or Frederick the Gentle (1412–1464), ruler of Saxony from 1428 to 1464
Frederick III, Elector of Saxony, or Frederick the Wise (1463–1525), ruler of Saxony from 1486 to 1525, protector of Martin Luther
Duke Frederick of Saxony (1474–1510), Grand Master of the Teutonic Knights
Frederick, Hereditary Prince of Saxony (1504–1539), son of George, Duke of Saxony
Frederick August I, Elector of Saxony, or Augustus II the Strong (1670–1733), ruler of Saxony from 1694 to 1733
Frederick August II, Elector of Saxony, or Augustus III of Poland (1696–1763), ruler of Saxony from 1733 to 1763
Frederick Christian, Elector of Saxony (1722–1763), ruler of Saxony for 74 days in 1763
Frederick Augustus I of Saxony (1750–1827), ruler of Saxony as elector and king from 1763 to 1827
Frederick Augustus II of Saxony (1797–1854), King of Saxony from 1836 to 1854
Frederick Augustus III of Saxony (1865–1932), King of Saxony from 1904 to 1918